Fernando Manuel Fernandes da Costa Santos  (born 10 October 1954) is a Portuguese professional football manager and former player who played as a defender. He is the manager of the Poland national team.

He amassed Primeira Liga totals of 161 games and two goals over eight seasons, almost always with Estoril. After retiring, he worked as a coach for several decades, starting out at his main club in 1988. 

Santos managed Portugal's Big Three, winning five major titles with Porto. For the better part of the 2000s he worked in Greece, mainly with AEK Athens and PAOK. In 2010, he was appointed at the helm of the Greece national team, coaching them in a World Cup and one European Championship. Subsequently, he led Portugal to victory in the Euro 2016 and the 2019 Nations League, which were the first two major titles in the nation's history, before leaving in 2022. The following year, he took over as manager of Poland.

Playing career
Born in Lisbon, Santos finished his development with Benfica, having joined its youth system at the age of 16. His senior debut was made with Estoril, which he went on to represent in all three major levels of Portuguese football.

Santos made his Primeira Liga debut on 7 September 1975, playing the full 90 minutes in a 2–0 home win against Farense. He finished his first season with a further 12 appearances, helping his team to the eighth position.

Santos scored his first goals in the top division in the 1978–79 campaign, only missing one league game in an eventual 11th-place finish. For 1979–80, he moved to Marítimo, where he was also first choice. Having returned to his previous club, he played with them a further eight years (five being spent in the Segunda Liga) before retiring at the age of 33.

Coaching career

Estoril and Porto
Santos started working as a manager immediately after retiring. He helped Estoril return to the top tier in 1991 and, in the following ten years, only worked in that competition, being in charge of Estrela da Amadora and Porto.

Having signed for the latter side in summer 1998, Santos won the national championship and the Portuguese Supercup in his first season. He finished second in the following to Sporting CP, and led the team to the quarter-finals of the UEFA Champions League.

Greece and Sporting CP
In 2001, Santos was appointed at AEK Athens in the Super League Greece, winning the domestic cup and losing the league to Olympiacos on goal difference. Staying in the country, he then joined Panathinaikos, leaving by mutual consent after only four months.

Santos returned to his country for the 2003–04 campaign, replacing László Bölöni at the helm of Sporting. He was relieved of his duties on 2 June 2004, after his team was only able to rank third.

From 2004 to 2006, Santos again managed AEK. He led them to consecutive top-three finishes during his tenure, being voted Manager of the Year in 2005.

Benfica

On 20 May 2006, Santos joined former youth club Benfica. He was responsible for the signing of former AEK player Kostas Katsouranis the following month.

After a third place in his debut season, only two points behind champions Porto, Santos witnessed the departure of captain and top scorer Simão Sabrosa to Atlético Madrid during pre-season. On 20 August 2007, after a 1–1 away draw against Leixões, he was sacked and replaced with José Antonio Camacho.

PAOK
Santos returned to Greece and its top flight in early September 2007, signing a three-year contract with PAOK. There, he joined forces with director of football – and former international – Theodoros Zagorakis, leading the team to the second position in 2009–10.

On 19 May 2010, despite a chance of competing again in the Champions League, Santos announced his decision of leaving the Thessaloniki-based side in a press conference.

Greece national team
On 1 July 2010, Santos was named the new coach of the Greece national team, succeeding longtime incumbent Otto Rehhagel on a two-year deal. He qualified the country to the UEFA Euro 2012 tournament, subsequently reaching the last-eight stage.

Santos was also in charge during the 2014 FIFA World Cup in Brazil, as Greece reached the knockout stage for the first time ever. Shortly before the start of the penalty shootout against Costa Rica, eventually lost 5–3, he was sent off by referee Ben Williams for apparent dissent. He watched the decision unfold on a television from inside the stadium, and the defeat marked the end of his tenure as his contract expired the very next day; he was initially banned for eight matches for the incident, reduced to six upon appeal.

Portugal national team

On 23 September 2014, Santos was chosen as the new manager of Portugal, after Paulo Bento was fired due to poor results. His first game in charge took place on 14 October in a 1–0 win in Denmark for the Euro 2016 qualifiers, and the side went on to reach the finals in France; during his suspension, it was Ilídio Vale that sat on the bench.

On 10 July 2016, after three group stage draws that enabled group stage qualification as third, Santos coached Portugal to its first-ever major international conquest, after a 1–0 extra time defeat of the hosts. The only win in 90 minutes occurred in the semi-finals, against Wales, but his team was also the only undefeated in the tournament.

On 10 October 2017, the day of his 63rd birthday, Santos coached Portugal to a 2–0 win over Switzerland at the Estádio da Luz, which enabled them to finish the 2018 World Cup qualifying campaign with nine wins in ten games. In the finals in Russia, the tournament ended at the round-of-16 stage after a 2–1 loss against Uruguay.

After conquering the 2018–19 UEFA Nations League, Santos led the national team to the round of 16 at Euro 2020, where they lost 1–0 to Belgium. In the 2022 World Cup, after being disrespected by star forward Cristiano Ronaldo in the last group fixture against South Korea as he was replaced (2–1 loss), he decided to bench him for the knockout stages, beating Switzerland 6–1 in the last 16 but being ousted by Morocco in the next round; on 15 December, he was dismissed.

Poland national team
On 24 January 2023, Santos was unveiled as the new manager of Poland, succeeding Czesław Michniewicz who left the team shortly after the 2022 World Cup.

Personal life
Santos earned a degree in electrical and telecommunications engineering, awarded in 1977 by the Instituto Superior de Engenharia de Lisboa. As he was in charge when Porto won its fifth consecutive championship in 1999, he was nicknamed Engenheiro do Penta (Penta's engineer).

In addition to his native Portuguese, Santos also speaks English and Greek.

Managerial statistics

Honours

Manager
Porto
Primeira Liga: 1998–99
Taça de Portugal: 1999–2000, 2000–01
Supertaça Cândido de Oliveira: 1998, 1999

AEK Athens
Greek Football Cup: 2001–02

Portugal
UEFA European Championship: 2016
UEFA Nations League: 2018–19
FIFA Confederations Cup third place: 2017

Individual
Super League Greece Manager of the Year: 2001–02, 2004–05, 2008–09, 2009–10
Super League Greece Manager of the Decade: 2000–10
Best Sports Coach in Greece: 2011, 2013
European Coach of the Year – Alf Ramsey Award: 2016
IFFHS World's Best National Coach: 2016, 2019
The Best FIFA Men's Coach: 2016 (Third place)
Globos de Ouro – Best Male Coach: 2017
PFA Platinum Quinas: 2019

Orders
 Grand Officer of the Order of Merit (10 July 2016)

References

External links

1954 births
Living people
Portuguese Roman Catholics
Portuguese footballers
Footballers from Lisbon
Association football defenders
Primeira Liga players
Liga Portugal 2 players
S.L. Benfica footballers
G.D. Estoril Praia players
C.S. Marítimo players
Portuguese football managers
Primeira Liga managers
Liga Portugal 2 managers
G.D. Estoril Praia managers
C.F. Estrela da Amadora managers
FC Porto managers
Sporting CP managers
S.L. Benfica managers
Super League Greece managers
AEK Athens F.C. managers
Panathinaikos F.C. managers
PAOK FC managers
Greece national football team managers
Portugal national football team managers
Poland national football team managers
UEFA Euro 2012 managers
2014 FIFA World Cup managers
UEFA Euro 2016 managers
2017 FIFA Confederations Cup managers
2018 FIFA World Cup managers
UEFA Euro 2020 managers
2022 FIFA World Cup managers
UEFA European Championship-winning managers
UEFA Nations League-winning managers
Portuguese expatriate football managers
Expatriate football managers in Greece
Expatriate football managers in Poland
Portuguese expatriate sportspeople in Greece
Portuguese expatriate sportspeople in Poland
Golden Globes (Portugal) winners